Theresa Senff (born 2 February 1982) is a road cyclist from Germany. She represented her nation at the 2003, 2004, 2005 and 2006 UCI Road World Championships.

References

External links
 profile at Procyclingstats.com

1982 births
Living people
People from Arnstadt
People from Bezirk Erfurt
German female cyclists
Cyclists from Thuringia
20th-century German women